Edwin Richards may refer to:

 Edwin Richards (field hockey) (1879–1930), Welsh field hockey player
 Edwin Richards (canoeist) (born 1957), New Zealand sprint canoer
 Edwin Richards (politician) (1856–1927), Australian politician
 Ed Richards (fencer) (1929–2012), American fencer